Millville is an unincorporated community in Franklin County, Indiana, in the United States.

History
Early settlers of Millville in Franklin County had family ties to Millville, Ohio.

References

Unincorporated communities in Franklin County, Indiana
Unincorporated communities in Indiana